W. Glyn Morgan (birth unknown) is a Welsh former rugby union and professional rugby league footballer who played in the 1930s, 1940s and 1950s.

Background
Glyn Morgan was born in Penygraig, Wales.

Playing career

International honours
Glyn Morgan won 4 caps for Wales (RL) in 1947–1949 while at Huddersfield and Cardiff RLFC.

Championship final appearances
Glyn Morgan played  in Huddersfield's 4–13 defeat by Wigan in the Championship Final during the 1945–46 season at Maine Road, Manchester on Saturday 18 May 1946.

References

External links

(archived by web.archive.org) Past Players → M & N at cardiffrfc.com
(archived by web.archive.org) Statistics at cardiffrfc.com
Search for "Glyndwr Morgan" at britishnewspaperarchive.co.uk
Search for "Glyn Morgan" at britishnewspaperarchive.co.uk

Cardiff RFC players
Cardiff RLFC players
Huddersfield Giants players
Possibly living people
Rugby league halfbacks
Rugby league players from Rhondda Cynon Taf
Rugby union players from Penygraig
Rugby union scrum-halves
Wales national rugby league team players
Welsh rugby league players
Welsh rugby union players
Year of birth missing